Masasi is one of the six districts of the Mtwara Region of Tanzania.  It is bordered to the north by the Lindi Region, to the east by the Newala District, to the south by the Ruvuma River and Mozambique and to the west by Nanyumbu District.

According to the 2012 Tanzania National Census, the population of Masasi District was 247,993 and in Masasi town the population was 102,696.

Council
Masasi District Council is among seven councils comprising Mtwara Region.

The district shares a border with Nachingwea and Ruangwa Districts to the North, Lindi and Newala Districts to the east, Ruvuma River to the south and Nanyumbu district to the West. The council's headquarters is situated 210 kilometers west of Mtwara Municipality which is the regional headquarters. The Masasi district council is also surrounding a new Masasi town council which started its operations in July 2012.

The council has five administrative divisions, 23 wards and 159 villages and 864 hamlets. Administratively Masasi is divided into two constituencies, Masasi and Lulindi. The council has a total of 46 councilors.

According to the National Population Census 2002, the district had a total population of 307,211 with an annual growth rate of 2.1 percent before the split of the councils. Currently, the population is 260,856 as per National Population Census 2012; 125,151 are male and 135,705 are female.

Masasi District Council is a council established under Section 5 of the Local Government (Urban/District Authorities) Act, 1982 under the ministerial establishment order No dated 1 January 1984 and Certification of Establishment No. 17420/12-83 issued by Clerk of the National Assembly on 31 December 1983.

Wards
The Masasi District is administratively divided into 18 wards below as follows:

 Chigugu
 Chiungutwa
 Lipumburu
 Lukuledi
 Lulindi
 Mbuyuni
 Mchaura
 Mkululu
 Mkundi
 Mnavira
 Mpindimbi
 Mwena
 Namajani
 Namalenga
 Namatutwe
 Nanganga
 Nanjota
 Sindano

References 

Districts of Mtwara Region